HMS Culloden was a 74-gun third-rate ship of the line of the Royal Navy, built at Deptford Dockyard, England, and launched on 18 May 1776. She was the fourth warship to be named after the Battle of Culloden, which took place in Scotland in 1746 and saw the defeat of the Jacobite rising.

She served with the Channel Fleet during the American War of Independence. May, 1778 under command of Capt. George Balfour. She saw action at the Battle of Cape St Vincent, before being sent out to the West Indies. Her stay there was brief, sailing for New York City with Admiral Rodney in August 1780 to join the North American station. The ship's specific duties were to blockade the French at Newport, Rhode Island where a French army of 6,000 had disembarked in July 1780.

On 23 January 1781, while trying to intercept French ships attempting to run the blockade at Newport, Rhode Island, Culloden encountered severe weather and ran aground at North Neck Point (Will's Point) in Montauk. All attempts to refloat the vessel were unsuccessful, but all the crew were saved, and Culloden's masts were taken aboard . The area is today known as Culloden Point.

Salvage operations
The British conducted salvage operations on the ship throughout March, retrieving all 28 eighteen-pounder guns from the upper deck, and all 18 nine-pounders from the quarterdeck. The larger cannons were pushed into the sea and the ship was then burned to the waterline and abandoned.

On 24 July 1781, Joseph Woodbridge of Groton, Connecticut sent a letter to George Washington offering to sell him sixteen 32-pounders from the wreck, and on 14 July 1815, Samuel Jeffers arrived in Newport, Rhode Island with 12 tons of pig iron and a 32-pounder from the wreck.

A gudgeon imprinted with the name Culloden was recovered. Subsequent recovery efforts brought up another 32-pounder cannon as well as copper sheathing. A sketch of the outline of the ruins showed the ship resting on a large boulder.

National Register of Historic Places

Since 1979 the wreck site has been listed on the National Register of Historic Places, which prohibits SCUBA divers from taking artifacts from, or otherwise disturbing the wreck.

The application notes that in addition to Revolutionary War connections, the shipwreck is important for showing the British state-of-the-art copper sheathing of the ship as well as the possibility that it may reveal problems about corruption in the British shipyards at the time. The application notes:

Finally, the Culloden shipwreck site may provide material insight into the political conditions existent in the British Admiralty during this period. James [1926:7-18] has written describing the strength and organization of the Royal Navy at the end of the Seven Years' War (1755–1762) and its subsequent dissipation between 1771 and 1778 through mismanagement and corruption under Lord Sandwich's control of the Admiralty. Construction of the Culloden occurred during the period that Admiralty corruption was at its height. Therefore, the Culloden may reflect in material terms corrupt practices plaguing England's shipyards at the time. Construction shortcuts and the manufacturing of parts that do not meet specifications have long characterized the defense industry of all nations. The Culloden shipwreck site may provide data illustrating this activity.

Citations and notes

References

 Culloden, H.M.S., Shipwreck Site . New York's State and National Registers of Historic Places Document Imaging Project. Retrieved 2 September 2008.
 HMS Culloden. Hunting New England Shipwrecks. Retrieved 2 September 2008.
 Michael Phillips. Culloden (74) (1776). Michael Phillips' Ships of the Old Navy. Retrieved 2 September 2008.
 New York (NY) - Suffolk County. National Register of Historic Places. Retrieved 2 September 2008.
 
 Lavery, Brian (2003) The Ship of the Line – Volume 1: The development of the battlefleet 1650–1850. Conway Maritime Press. .

 

Ships of the line of the Royal Navy
Culloden-class ships of the line
Shipwrecks of the New York (state) coast
East Hampton (town), New York
New York (state) in the American Revolution
Military units and formations of Great Britain in the American Revolutionary War
Archaeological sites on the National Register of Historic Places in New York (state)
Shipwrecks on the National Register of Historic Places in New York (state)
1776 ships
Maritime incidents in 1781
Ships built in Deptford
National Register of Historic Places in Suffolk County, New York
American Revolution on the National Register of Historic Places
Corruption in England